Wuli was a kingdom located on the north bank of the Gambia River in what is now the eastern portion of The Gambia and the Tambacounda region of Senegal. It was ruled by the Wally family. The capital was located in the village of Bantunding.

History

According to oral tradition, Mandinka immigrants from Mali led by Tiramakhan Traore, one of Sundiata's top generals, first came to Wuli in the 14th century. The independent kingdom of Wuli was founded in the 15th century. It was an important center of trade in slaves, salt, gold, leather, shellfish, beeswax, European manufactures and other goods, linking the Atlantic coast, the Senegal River, and the Manding heartland in the Niger River basin. The Portuguese and other European nations traded at the important river port of Fattatenda, near the modern-day villages of Baja Kunda and Sutukoba. This was the last major trading post on the river below the falls of Barra Kunda, which hampered travel further upstream, so Wuli was a key hub linking river traffic and caravans.

Wuli eventually fell under the hegemony of the Jolof Empire and paid tribute to the Buur or king. During this period, Wuli's neighboring states on the north bank of the Gambia - Nyumi, Badibu, and Nyani - did as well.

Around the turn of the 19th century, the Scottish explorer Mungo Park passed through Wuli on both of his voyages to the Niger River. Soon afterwards, the kingdom, led by Mansa Koyo, defeated Nyani in a war.

When the colonial empires of France and Great Britain set the boundary between The Gambia and Senegal in the 1890s, Wuli was divided in two. This division, coupled with the rise of rail transport at the expense of river trade, economically marginalized the area.

References 

19th century in the Gambia
History of Senegambia
History of Senegal
History of the Gambia
Kingdoms of Senegal
Kingdoms
Gambia River
Trade